Hydrellia geniculata is a species of fly in the family Ephydridae.

Distribution
Austria, Italy, Japan, Sweden.

References

Ephydridae
Insects described in 1844
Diptera of Europe
Diptera of Asia
Taxa named by Christian Stenhammar